The Fort Madison Toll Bridge (also known as the Santa Fe Swing Span Bridge for the old Santa Fe Railway) is a tolled, double-decked swinging truss bridge over the Mississippi River that connects Fort Madison, Iowa, and unincorporated Niota, Illinois. A double-track railway occupies the lower deck of the bridge, while two lanes of road traffic are carried on the upper deck. It replaced an inadequate combination roadway/single-track bridge completed in 1887. In 1999, it was listed in the National Register of Historic Places under the title, Fort Madison Bridge, ID number 99001035. It was also documented as survey number IA-62 by the Historic American Engineering Record, archived at the Library of Congress. Construction and photographic details were recorded at the time in Scientific American magazine.

Iowa Highway 2 formerly reached the bridge from the west. On July 26, 1927, operations were transferred from the original single-track bridge to the current double-track bridge. The first opening for river traffic occurred at 11:58 a.m. on July 26, 1927, for the scow , traveling downriver with no barges attached.

The bridge is privately owned by BNSF Railway and is the river crossing for the Southern Transcon, BNSF's Chicago–Southern California main line. In 2022, between 40 and 100 trains crossed the bridge each day, including Amtrak's Southwest Chief.

Per Coast Guard regulations and the BNSF Fort Madison River Bridge operations manual, river traffic has the right-of-way over train and vehicle traffic on the bridge. Durations of openings vary depending on weather, river current, size and number of boats, and, occasionally, mechanical problems. A typical opening for a tow with 15 barges lasts 15–20 minutes. The bridge opens over 2,000 times per year, an average of more than five times per day.

Automobile traffic
As of 2022, the upper deck of the Fort Madison Toll Bridge is open to automobile traffic. It is closed to semi-trailer truck traffic. The BNSF, which owns and maintains the bridge has posted the following limits: Gross weight posted as no more than 16,000 Pounds (8 Tons). Width: 8 Ft. Height: 14 Ft. 4 In. Length: 60 Feet.

See also

List of crossings of the Upper Mississippi River
List of bridges documented by the Historic American Engineering Record in Illinois
List of bridges documented by the Historic American Engineering Record in Iowa
List of road–rail bridges

References

Road bridges in Illinois
Railroad bridges in Illinois
Swing bridges in the United States
Truss bridges in the United States
Bridges over the Mississippi River
Toll bridges in Illinois
Toll bridges in Iowa
Road-rail bridges in the United States
Bridges completed in 1927
Road bridges on the National Register of Historic Places in Iowa
Railroad bridges on the National Register of Historic Places in Iowa
BNSF Railway bridges
Atchison, Topeka and Santa Fe Railway
Bridges in Lee County, Iowa
Buildings and structures in Hancock County, Illinois
National Register of Historic Places in Lee County, Iowa
Great River Road
Drawbridges on the National Register of Historic Places
Fort Madison, Iowa
National Register of Historic Places in Hancock County, Illinois
1927 establishments in Iowa
1927 establishments in Illinois
Historic American Engineering Record in Illinois
Historic American Engineering Record in Iowa
Interstate vehicle bridges in the United States
Steel bridges in the United States